Baseera Khan is a New York-based artist. They use a variety of mediums in their practice to "visualize patterns and repetitions of exile and kinship shaped by economic, social, and political changes in local and global environments, with special interests in decolonization processes".

Their work navigates the political circumstances of their identity as a self-identified queer femme Muslim and "as a feminist, and as a brown Indian-Afghani".

Early life and education 
Khan grew up in Denton, Texas, raised by working class, Muslim parents who lived in near-isolation because of the threat of deportation. Their parents emigrated from Bangalore, India to the United States before they were born.

They received a B.F.A. in drawing/painting and sociology from the University of North Texas in 2005, and an M.F.A. from the Cornell University College of Architecture, Art and Planning in 2012. In 2014, they completed the Skowhegan School of Painting and Sculpture program.

Career 
Khan is a conceptual artist who uses a variety of mediums to "visualize patterns and repetitions of exile and kinship shaped by economic, social, and political changes in local and global environments, with special interests in decolonization processes".

Khan's first solo exhibition in New York was at the Participant Inc gallery space in 2017. The exhibition, titled "iamuslima", was named after the eponymous term that Khan had Nike stitch on a pair of sneakers as a way of protesting Nike Inc.'s refusal to allow the words "Islam" or "Muslim"  on its customizable sneaker models.

In 2018, Khan was an artist in residence at Pioneer Works in Red Hook, Brooklyn. Other residencies and fellowships include an artist residency at Abrons Arts Center (2016–17), an International Travel Fellowship to Jerusalem/Ramallah through Apexart (2015) and a Process Space artist residency at the Lower Manhattan Cultural Council (2015).

In 2022, Khan was commissioned to create a series of sculptures based on the form of a Corinthian column – albeit one that seems to have been toppled and wrapped in handmade silk rugs from Kashmir – for Meta’s Manhattan office complex in the historic James A. Farley Building.

In 2023, Khan was a contestant on The Exhibit: Finding the Next Great Artist, a reality TV series that aired on MTV and the Smithsonian Channel.

Exhibitions 
 2015: Walk with Me, Critical Practices Inc., New York, New York
 2015: Of Gentle Birth,  Brooklyn Arts Council, Brooklyn, New York
 2016: BRIC Biennial, Weeksville Heritage Center, Brooklyn, New York
 2016: SKOWHEGANPerforms, Socrates Sculpture Park, New York, New York
 2016: Subject to Capital, Abrons Art Center, New York, New York
 2017: Standard Forms, curated by Christian Camacho-Light, Art Galleries at The Berrie Center for Performing and Visual Arts, Ramapo College of New Jersey, New Jersey
 2017: Ritual, Aspen Art Museum, Aspen, Colorado 
 2017: Other Romances, curated by Em Rooney, Rachel Uffner Gallery, New York, NY
 2017: Sessions, Whitney Museum of American Art, New York, New York
 2017: Fatal Love, Queens Museum, Queens, New York
 2017: Iamuslima, Participant Inc. Gallery, New York, New York
 2018: How to see in the dark, curated by Christian Camacho-Light, Cuchifritos, New York, New York
 2018: Not for Everybody, curated by Allie Tepper, Simone Subal Gallery, New York, New York
 2018: Long, Winding Journeys: Contemporary Art and the Islamic Tradition, Katonah Museum of Art, Katonah, New York
 2018: SEED, Paul Kasmin Gallery, New York, New York
 2018: Carry Over: New Voices from the Global African Diaspora, Smack Mellon, Brooklyn, New York
 2018: Mane n' Tail, Luminary, St. Louis, MO
 2018: ROYGBIV, Kate Werble Gallery, New York, New York
 2018: I am no bird..., ltd Los Angeles, California
 2018: In Practice: Another Echo, SculptureCenter, New York, New York
 2018: Long, Winding Journeys: Contemporary Art and the Islamic Tradition, Katonah Museum of Art, Katonah, New York
 2018: LOVE 2018: Purple Hearts, LeRoy Neiman Gallery at Columbia University, New York
 2018: Hyphen American, Gallery 102, George Washington University, Washington, D.C.
 2018: iamuslima, Colorado Springs Fine Arts Center at Colorado College, Colorado
 2019: snake skin, Simone Subal Gallery, New York, 2019 

 Recognition 
In December 2016, Khan was listed by Artnet'', the art market website, as one of "14 Emerging Women Artists to Watch for 2017".

References

See also 
 

Year of birth missing (living people)
Living people
Cornell University alumni
Artists from New York (state)
Artists from Texas
American Muslims
Muslim artists
Feminist artists
American LGBT artists
LGBT people from Texas
American LGBT people of Asian descent
LGBT Muslims
21st-century LGBT people